Sirisena Amarasekara is a Sri Lankan public servant and diplomat. He is the former Sri Lankan High Commissioner to South Africa, Mozambique, Namibia,  Zambia, Zimbabwe, Lesotho, Angola, Botswana, and Eswatin. He had functioned as the secretary to the Prime Minister on two occasions, and as the secretary to the Cabinet of Sri Lanka. Having completed more than 50 years of public service, Amarasekara is one of the most senior Sri Lankan public servants.

Early life and education 
Sirisena Amarasekara was born in 1946 in Mideniya, which is situated in the Hambantota District, on the southern coast of Sri Lanka. He is a BCom (Hon) graduate from the University of Peradeniya. He also holds postgraduate qualifications in Development Economics from the University of Bath and also has postgraduate qualifications from the University of Birmingham.

Career 
Amarasekara joined the Ministry of Planning and Economic Affairs in 1970 and served for more than 50 years in the public sector in various senior positions. He served for 20 years as a Secretary for ministries such as Highways and Road Development, Fisheries and Aquaculture Development, Ports and Shipping, and Agriculture. He also served as the Secretary to the Prime Minister on two occasions, and as the Secretary to the Cabinet of Ministers. 

He has also served as the Chairman of Road Development Authority and Chairman of the Urban Development Authority. After his retirement from the public service in 2015 he served as the chairman of the 'Pavura association of  Intellectual Professionals' and as the president of 'Voice for Justice' a NGO to voice against political victimization.

He has served in various positions in the past including as the Secretary to the Ministry of Western Regional Development, Chairman of the Petroleum Corporation, Chairman of the Road Development Authority, Chairman of the Urban Development Authority, Chairman of the Hector Kobbekaduwa Agriculture Research Institute, Director General of Regional Development as part of the Ministry of Policy Planning, Director of Integrated Rural Development project of Matara District, Director General of Mahaweli Authority, and the Additional Director General of Southern Development Authority.

In September 2020, he was appointed Sri Lankan High Commissioner Extraordinary and Plenipotentiary for South Africa, Mozambique, Namibia,  Zambia, Zimbabwe, Lesotho, Angola, Botswana, and Eswatini (the Sri Lankan diplomatic missions for the aforementioned nations fall under the purview of the Sri Lankan diplomatic mission in Pretoria). As the Sri Lankan High Commissioner, he functioned as the executive head of the Sri Lankan diplomatic mission in Pretoria, South Africa.

Secretary to the Prime Minister 
Following the Appointment of the new prime minister D.M. Jayaratne in 2010, Amarasekara, who functioned as the Secretary to the Ministry of Agriculture at that time, was appointed as the Secretary to the Prime Minister, and continued to function in this office until 2015, when he was succeeded by S. Ekanayaka.

In 2018, when the former president Mahinda Rajapaksa was appointed Prime Minister, Sirisena Amarasekara was appointed the Secretary to the Prime Minister. This was the second time he served in this office.

Past Appointments 
 Sri Lankan High Commissioner to South Africa
 Secretary to the Prime Minister
 Secretary to the Cabinet of Ministers
 Secretary to Ministry of Highways and Road Development
 Secretary to Ministry of Fisheries and Aquaculture Development
 Secretary to Ministry of Ports and Shipping
 Secretary to Ministry of Agriculture
 Secretary to the Ministry of Western Regional Development
 Chairman of Petroleum Corporation
 Chairman of Road Development Authority
 Chairman of Urban Development Authority
 Chairman of the Sri Lanka Telecom 
 Chairman of Hector Kobbekaduwa Agricultural Research Institute
 Secretary of the Southern Development Task Force
 Director General of Regional Development (Ministry of Policy Planning)
 Director of Integrated Rural Development Project of Matara District
 Director General of Mahaweli Authority
 Director General of Southern Development Authority

Personal life 
Srisena Amarasekara is married to A.D.H. Amarasekara and has two sons: Chaminda Amarasekara, who is a Doctor in the service of the Sri Lanka Navy, and Lasantha Amarasekara, who is a banker.

References 

1947 births
Living people
Alumni of the University of Bath
Alumni of the University of Peradeniya
Sri Lankan political people
Sri Lankan civil servants
Sri Lankan diplomats
Permanent secretaries of Sri Lanka